(stylized as WANDS) is a Japanese rock band formed in 1991 and active until 2000 under the label B-Gram Records. In 2019, the band reunited with a new vocalist, Daishi Uehara, and two former members, Shibasaki and Kimura, under the D-Go recording label. In the span of 29 years, the band has had three lead vocalists and changed instrumental members five times.

Members

Wesugi period
  (1991-1996)- vocalist, lyricist, composer, arranger
  (1991-1992)-keyboardist, composer, arranger
  (1991-1996)-guitarist, composer, arranger
 (1992-1996)-keyboardist, lyricist, composer, arranger

Waku period
  (1997-2000)-vocalist, lyricist, arranger
  (1997-2000)-guitarist, lyricist, composer, arranger
  (1992-2000)-keyboardist, lyricist, composer, arranger

Uehara period
 (2019-)- vocalist, lyricist
 (1991-1996, 2019-)-guitarist, composer, arranger
 (1992-2000, 2019-)-keyboardist, lyricist, composer, arranger

Career

1991–1996: Commercial success with Show Wesugi
The band was founded in 1991 by main vocalist Show Wesugi, guitarist Hiroshi Shibasaki, and keyboardist Kousuke Oshima. Wesugi was a fan of Axl Rose and Oshima was a guest member of Japanese rock band Loudness. The band was named after wands of tarot. They debuted with single "Sabishisa wa Aki no Iro (Loneliness is Autumn Color)". Their 1992 single "Motto Tsuyoku Dakishimeta Nara (If I Embrace You More Strongly)" reached #1 and was charted for 44 weeks on the Japanese Oricon charts.

In 1992, Shinya Kimura joined the band following Oshima's departure. Collaborating with Miho Nakayama, they released "Sekaijū no Dare Yori Kitto (Certainly More Than Everybody in the World)" in October 1992, which became one of the standard J-pop songs. That year, they took part in Kōhaku Uta Gassen, a famous year-end show in Japan, with this song.

Wesugi wrote Deen's debut song "Konomama Kimidake wo Ubaisaritai (Now, I Want to Make Off with Only You)", which sold over a million copies after its release in March 1993. In April, their album Toki no Tobira (Temporal Door) and single "Ai wo Kataru yori Kuchizuke wo Kawaso (Let's Kiss More Than Talking Love)" both reached #1 positions on the Oricon charts, making them the second artist to achieve this, following Seiko Matsuda. "Ai wo Kataru yori Kuchizuke wo Kawaso" remained #1 for four consecutive weeks. Toki no Tobira was charted for 33 weeks on the Oricon album charts. They sold over 4.11 million singles and 3.18 million albums in a year, winning the "Artist of the Year" award at the 8th Japan Gold Disc Award.

Their 1994 single "Sekai ga Owaru made wa... (Until the End of the World...)" reached #1 on Oricon charts and was certified as a million-selling single by Recording Industry Association of Japan (RIAJ). It was the closing theme song of the anime series Slam Dunk. Wesugi loved grunge and wanted to turn into alternative rock. "Sekai ga Owaru made wa..." became the last song written in his former style because he felt that many musicians around him were doing the same thing. Their next single, "Secret Night (It's My Treat)," shifted to power pop and created controversies. Their 1995 studio album, Piece of My Soul, reached the #1 position on the Oricon charts, with sales of over 542,000 copies the first week.

Wesugi's image continued to change with the song "Same Side". His new style was said to be "painterly" and their new album was influenced by punk and blues, according to Wesugi. After the release of the single "Worst Crime (About a Rock Star who was a Swindler)" in February 1996, Wesugi and Shibasaki withdrew from the band. Their withdrawals were officially announced in 1997.

Wesugi continued his music career and performed in the sixth anniversary of Hide's death in 2004. Shibasaki formed rock band Abingdon Boys School with Takanori Nishikawa in 2005. Oshima also worked with Nishikawa on the 2006 album Under Cover.

1997–2000: Third period with Waku
Shinya Kimura re-formed the group with vocalist Jiro Waku and guitarist Issei Sugimoto. Jiro Waku, whose real name is Jiro Matsumoto, was the first leader of twelve skateboarding boys (predecessor of SMAP) in Johnny & Associates. Their debut song, "Sabitsuita Machine Gun de Ima o Uchinukō", written by Miho Komatsu, was used as the end credits theme for Dragon Ball GT. Their next single, "Brand New Love", was written by Izumi Sakai. Sakai also wrote the song "Ashita moshi Kimi ga kowaretemo" (lit. "Even if you shatter tomorrow"), which was used as the closing theme for Season 0 of Yu-Gi-Oh! produced by Toei Animation. Their next single, "Kyo, Nanika no Hazumi de Ikiteiru" (lit. "Today, I live by some chance"), was written by Nana Azuki, a future member of Garnet Crow, and by Makoto Miyoshi, a future member of Rumania Montevideo. However, their first studio album, Awake, released on 27 October 1999, only charted for three weeks, peaking at #18 on the Oricon charts. Through the official website, the band from the third period announced its disbandment in 2000.

2019-present: Fourth and Fifth Wands period with Daishi Uehara
On 13 November 2019, the fifth period of Wands was announced with new vocalist, Daishi Uehara, along with former members Shibasaki and Kimura. On 17 November 2019, the band made their first stage appearance in 18 years at Dojima River Forum. In January 2020, their new original song, "Makka na Lip", was released under the Giza Studio record label. It is also the opening theme song of the anime television series Detective Conan.

On 16 February 2020, it was announced that a new single, "Daki Yose, Takamaru, Kimi no Taion to Tomoni", written by Shibasaki and Haibara, would be released in May. The announcement happened after a Special Live event. The single was promoted as the theme song of the Japanese television series Silent Voice. It is their first television drama theme song for the first time in 28 years.

Discography

Studio albums

Wands (1992)
Toki no Tobira (1993)
Little Bit… (1993)
Piece of My Soul (1995)
Awake (1999)
Burn The Secret (2020)

References

External links
  

Japanese pop rock music groups
Japanese hard rock musical groups
Japanese alternative rock groups
Musical groups established in 1991
Musical groups disestablished in 2000
Musical groups reestablished in 2019
Being Inc. artists
Musical groups from Tokyo
1991 establishments in Japan
2000 disestablishments in Japan
2019 establishments in Japan